Phil H. Jones was a member of the Wisconsin State Assembly.

Biography
Jones was born on February 9, 1874, in Genesee, Wisconsin. Later, he would reside on a farm in Delafield (town), Wisconsin. In 1894, Jones graduated from what was then Carroll College. During the Spanish–American War, he served with the United States Army.

Political career
Jones was elected to the Assembly in 1910. Other positions he held include member of the board of supervisors of Delafield. He was a Republican.

References

People from Genesee, Wisconsin
Republican Party members of the Wisconsin State Assembly
Carroll University alumni
Military personnel from Wisconsin
American military personnel of the Spanish–American War
United States Army soldiers
Farmers from Wisconsin
1874 births
Year of death missing
People from Delafield, Wisconsin